The Lincoln Trail Conference is a high school conference in western central Illinois. The conference participates in athletics and activities in the Illinois High School Association (IHSA). The conference comprises public high schools with small enrollments in portions of Bureau, Henderson, Henry, Knox, Mercer, Peoria, Rock Island, Stark, and Warren counties.

Current membership

Sources:IHSA Conferences and IHSA Member Schools Directory

History
The Lincoln Trail Conference (LTC) was established in 1976. The eight charter members included Cambridge, Winola, and Alwood from the Corn Belt Conference; Alexis, Galva and ROVA from the Little 6 Conference; and Wethersfield and Toulon-LaFayette from the Blackhawk Conference.

Wethersfield played an independent schedule that first season and its first full conference slate wasn't until 1977. In 1988 Viola-Winola closed and Joy-Westmer replaced them in 1989. In 1992 Toulon consolidated with Wyoming and became known as Stark County. Alexis left briefly in 1993 and Annawan and Princeville joined in 1995. In 1998 Alexis was back in along with newcomers Biggsville Union and Monmouth Warren. The league divided into two divisions with Cambridge, Galva, Wethersfield, ROWVA, Princeville and Stark County in the East, and Alexis, Annawan, Biggsville, Westmer, Warren and Alwood in the West. In 2004 Alexis and Monmouth Warren consolidated forming Alexis United, and Biggsville Union left the loop to coop with Stronghurst Southern and the division set up was dropped. In 2005 Oneida ROWVA and Woodhull-Alwood co-oped in football and Biggsville Union rejoined under the name of West Central having consolidated with Stronghurst Southern. Football was not a conference sport from 2006–2009. During that time the Lincoln Trail Conference was a component of the West Prairie Trail mega conference for football only. The components of the West Prairie Trail conference were the West Central Conference, Prairieland Conference and Lincoln Trail Conference. The Lincoln Trail may reform as a football conference moving forward with the following teams: Annawan/Wethersfield co-op, Cambridge/AlWood co-op, Galva/Williamsfield co-op, Mercer County, Stark County, Princeville, Sciota West Prairie, West Central, and the River Valley co-op (Henry, Low Point-Washburn, Midland) which is not a member for other sports.

Prior to the advent of the Lincoln Trail Conference, the schools of the present day conference are known to have participated in several other conferences. During the life of the conference many changes have occurred, the following table and timeline  summarize major events:

Timeline
 1976 – Lincoln Trial Conference forms with initial members Alexis, AlWood, Cambridge, Galva, ROVA, Toulon-LaFayette, Wethersfield, and Winola
 1987 – ROVA consolidates with Wataga students attending Galesburg to become ROWVA
 1988 – Winola leaves
 1989 – Westmer joins
 1992 – Toulon-LaFayette consolidates with Wyoming to become Stark County
 1993 – Alexis leaves
 1995 – Annawan and Princeville join
 1997 – Divisional east and west format adopted for boys football
 1998 – Alexis returns, Union joins, and Warren joins
 2004 – Union leaves, Alexis consolidates with Warren to become United, divisional format dropped for boys football
 2005 – West Central joins
 2006 – Aledo joins and boys football leaves to participate in the West Prairie Trail mega conference
 2007 – Yorkwood consolidates into United
 2009 – Aledo and Westmer consolidate to become Mercer County
 2010 – Boys football returns
 2021- Abingdon-Avon and Knoxville join from Prairieland Conference

Membership timeline

Competitive success
The Lincoln Trail Conference has won 3 team state championships and 1 individual championship in IHSA sponsored athletics and activities. Through the 2008–2009 season the conference has won Illinois state titles in:
 Boys Football (Wethersfield 2001–2002; United 2004–2005; Mercer County 2012–2013)
 Girls Track and Field (West Central High School Theresa Brokaw Class A 1600 meter run 2006)

Prior to the advent of the Lincoln Trail Conference, or before joining the conference several member schools won Illinois state championships, including:
 Boys Football (Aledo in the Olympic Conference 1998–1999, 2000–2001, 2002–2003)
 Boys Golf (Aledo in the Olympic Conference 1984–1985)  
 Boys Track & Field (Bigssville 1898–1899, 1899–1900)

Cooperative arrangements
Due to the small enrollment, several Lincoln Trail Conference schools form cooperative arrangements. The current arrangements are shown below.

Boys Baseball
 AlWood and Cambridge
 Annawan and Wethersfield
 ROWVA and Williamsfield (non-Conference)
Boys Basketball
 AlWood and Cambridge
 ROWVA and Williamsfield (non-Conference)
Girls Basketball
 AlWood and Cambridge
Boys Cross Country
 AlWood and Cambridge
 Annawan and Wethersfield
 Galva and ROWVA
Girls Cross Country
 AlWood and Cambridge
 Annawan and Wethersfield
 Galva and ROWVA
Boys Football
 AlWood and Cambridge
 Annawan and Wethersfield
 Galva, ROWVA, and Williamsfield (non-Conference)
Girls Volleyball
 AlWood and Cambridge
Boys Golf
 AlWood and Cambridge
 Annawan and Wethersfield
 Galva and ROWVA
 West Central and West Prairie (non-Conference)
Girls Golf
 AlWood and Cambridge
 Annawan and Wethersfield
 Galva and ROWVA
 West Central and West Prairie (non-Conference)
Boys Track and Field
 AlWood and Cambridge 
 Annawan and Wethersfield
 ROWVA and Williamsfield (non-Conference)
Girls Track and Field
 AlWood and Cambridge 
 Annawan and Wethersfield
 ROWVA and Williamsfield (non-Conference)
Girls Softball
 AlWood and Cambridge
 Annawan and Wethersfield

References

External links

 Lincoln Trail Conference
 AlWood
 Annawan
 Cambridge
 Galva
 Mercer County
 Princeville
 ROWVA
 Stark County
 United
 Wethersfield
 West Central

High school sports conferences and leagues in the United States
Illinois high school sports conferences
High school sports in Illinois